Klaipėda Central Stadium is a football stadium in Klaipėda, Lithuania.  It is the home ground of FK Atlantas, and has a capacity of 4,428.

References

Klaipeda Central Stadium
Buildings and structures in Klaipėda
Sport in Klaipėda